Louisa Emily Dobrée (c. 1852 – 1917) was a 19th-century-born French-Irish Catholic writer of novels, fugitive articles, short stories, and juvenile literature. Her non-fiction subjects ranged from home nursing, domestic and personal hygiene, etiquette, character sketches, and embroidery, to natural history.

Biography
Louisa Emily Dobrée was born in Tours, France, c. 1852. She was of Irish descent on her mother's side, while her father's family, of Guernsey, was originally French.

Dobrée's first story was published when she was nineteen. This was followed by fugitive articles and short stories in magazines. She also wrote books for young people, among which are the following:— Loved into Shape, Dreams and Deeds, Terry, One Talent Only, A Knotless Thread, Underneath the Surface, A Lowly Life with a Lofty Aim, and Turned to Gold, as well as Hugh Templar's motto, Underneath the Surface. A Sark Story, Leon and the Lessons He Learned. A Jersey Story, and Only Johnny Brown. These were published at intervals of sometimes great length.

In 1887, Dobrée was received into the Catholic Church, and her books thereafter included:— A Manual of Home Nursing, Stories on the Sacraments, A Seven-Fold Treasure, Per Parcel Post, A Tug-of War, Stories on the Beatitudes, Beautiful Sewing, and Plain Work, among others. She was on the staff and an occasional contributor to twenty magazines, the subjects on which she wrote upon including home nursing, domestic and personal hygiene, etiquette, character sketches, embroidery, plain work, and natural history.

Dobrée lived a great deal in the Channel Islands, France, and Ireland, besides having paid visits, long and short, to Italy, Switzerland, Austria, Belgium, and Germany. She later lived at Chiswick, near London. The scenes of her stories were always set in Europe.

Selected works

 Loved into shape; or, The story of Bob Sanders, 1877
 Dreams and Deeds, 1877
 One Talent Only, 1878
 Hugh Templar's motto, 1879
 "Not useless", 1879
 A Knotless Thread, 1879
 Underneath the Surface. A Sark Story, 1881
 Turned to Gold, 1881
 A Lowly Life with a Lofty Aim, 1881
 A life lesson, 1884
 Only Johnny Brown, 1886
 Leon and the Lessons He Learned. A Jersey Story, 1886
 Kit and His Violin, 1888
 A Manual of Home Nursing, 1889
 Little King I.A Story for the Young ... With Illustrations, Etc, 1890
 Loved Into Shape ; Or, the Story of Bob Sanders., 1891
 A Christmas lesson, 1891
 A lowly life with a lofty aim, 1891
 A Tug-of War, 1891
 A sevenfold treasure : stories on the gifts of the Holy Spirit, 1892
 Winifred's work, 1892
 Per Parcel Post, 1892
 Stories on the Beatitudes, 1894
 A workhouse concert, 1894
 Coals of fire, 1894
 Uncle Luke's legacy, 1894
 Dick's desire, 1894
 Stories on the Rosary. Part I, 1897
 Stories on the Rosary. Part 2, 1898
 Sylvia's Lesson: Extreme Unction, 19??
 The Two Wishes: A Story of Holy Orders, 19??
 Brian Daly: A Story of Holy Communion, 19??
 You Did it Unto Me: Stories on the Corporal Works of Mercy, 1903
 Stories on the Rosary. Part 3, The glorious mysteries, 1904
 Among the saucepans, 1915
 Ever a fighter, 1915
 Driving a bargain, 1915
 Father Carlton's offerings, 1915
 Don Filippo's dream, 1915
 Stories from Italy, 1915
 The Kingdoms of the World, 1917
 Terry
 Stories of the Seven Sacraments
 Beautiful Sewing
 Plain Work

References

Year of birth unknown
Year of death unknown
19th-century French novelists
20th-century French novelists
19th-century Irish novelists
20th-century Irish novelists
19th-century French non-fiction writers
20th-century French non-fiction writers
19th-century Irish non-fiction writers
20th-century Irish non-fiction writers
19th-century French short story writers
20th-century French short story writers
19th-century Irish short story writers
20th-century Irish short story writers
19th-century French women writers
20th-century French women writers
19th-century Irish women writers
20th-century Irish women writers
Writers from Tours, France
French Roman Catholic writers
French children's writers
Irish children's writers
French women novelists
French women short story writers
French women children's writers
Irish women novelists
Irish women short story writers
Irish women children's writers
French religious writers
1852 births
1917 deaths